Silver Strand may refer to:
 Silver Strand (film), a 1995 action film directed by George Miller
 Silver Strand Beach, a beach neighborhood near Oxnard, California
 Silver Strand (San Diego), an isthmus in San Diego County, California
 Silver Strand Falls, a waterfall in Yosemite National Park
 The Silver Strand (Ireland), a beach in southwest County Donegal, Ireland
 Silverstrand Beach, in Clear Water Bay Peninsula, Sai Kung, Hong Kong
 Silver Strand is an alternate name for the Marina Peninsula neighborhood of Los Angeles